Michael T. Morley is an American politician from the state of Utah. A member of the Republican Party, he served in the Utah House of Representatives. He did not seek reelection in 2012.

Born in Price, Utah, Morley resides in Spanish Fork, Utah. He and his wife, Krystin, have nine children.

References

External links
 

Living people
Republican Party members of the Utah House of Representatives
People from Price, Utah
People from Spanish Fork, Utah
Year of birth missing (living people)
21st-century American politicians